Color Schemes is an album by vibraphonist Bobby Hutcherson featuring performances recorded in 1985 and released the following year on Orrin Keepnews' Landmark label.

Reception

On AllMusic, Scott Yanow observed "On Color Schemes, Bobby Hutcherson (vibes) is backed by a top-notch rhythm section for a set of jazz standards and originals. Every selection has its worthwhile points ... This is an easily recommended album of high-quality, if conservative, music".

Track listing
All compositions by Bobby Hutcherson except where noted.
 "Recorda-Me" (Joe Henderson) – 5:52
 "Bemsha Swing" (Thelonious Monk, Denzil Best) – 4:52
 "Rosemary, Rosemary" – 5:09
 "Second-Hand Brown" – 5:28
 "Whisper Not" (Benny Golson) – 6:53
 "Color Scheme" – 4:12
 "Remember" (Irving Berlin) – 4:38
 "Never Let Me Go" (Jay Livingston, Ray Evans) – 6:17

Personnel
Bobby Hutcherson – vibraphone, marimba
Mulgrew Miller – piano
John Heard – bass
Billy Higgins – drums
Airto – percussion (tracks 1, 4, 6 & 8)

References

Landmark Records albums
Bobby Hutcherson albums
1986 albums
Albums produced by Orrin Keepnews